ERHS may refer to:

Schools
Eagle River High School
Eagle Rock High School
East Rockaway High School
East Ridge High School (Florida)
El Rancho High School (Pico Rivera, CA)
Eleanor Roosevelt High School (California)
Eleanor Roosevelt High School (Maryland)
Eleanor Roosevelt High School (New York City)
Emerald Ridge High School
Ernest Righetti High School
École River Heights School